The Methylophilaceae are a family of Pseudomonadota, given their own order. Like all Pseudomonadota, they are Gram-negative. The cells are slightly curved or straight rod-shaped.

References

External links
Methylophilaceae J.P. Euzéby: List of Prokaryotic names with Standing in Nomenclature

 
Betaproteobacteria